Pak Che-soon (7 December 1858 – 20 June 1916) was a Korean politician and diplomat during the late Joseon dynasty. His pen name was Pyeongjae (평재, 平齋). In modern South Korea, he is regarded as one of the Five Eulsa Traitors who betrayed the country into Japanese domination in 1905.

Biography
Pak was born in Yongin, outside Seoul where his father was a minor government official and supporter of Kim Yunsik. His family's clan name is Bannam.

In 1883, after passing the Korean Imperial Examination, he was sent to Tianjin. On October 9, 1898, he was promoted to the post of Foreign Minister, and it was in this capacity that he signed the Japan–Korea Treaty of 1905 (also known as the “Eulsa Treaty”), which effectively deprived Korea of its diplomatic sovereignty and made it a protectorate of the Empire of Japan. On November 28, 1905 he became a Minister of State. Pak was the Prime Minister of the Korean Empire from 1905 - 1907 and again from 1909 - 1910.

From 1907 to 1910, Pak served as Minister of the Interior under Ye Wanyong. It was in this capacity that he signed the Japan–Korea Treaty of 1910, by which Korea was formally annexed by the Empire of Japan. On October 16, 1910, Pak received the kazoku peerage title of Viscount (shishaku) from the Japanese government and a seat in the House of Peers of the Diet of Japan. He later served on the Central Advisory Institute of the Government-General of Korea. Under the Special law to redeem pro-Japanese collaborators' property enacted in 2005, the property of the descendants of nine people who had collaborated when Korea was annexed by Japan was confiscated by the South Korean government.

Honours 

 Order of the Taegeuk 3rd Class on 22 April 1900

 Royal Order of the Lion 3rd Class on 26 October 1901

See also
 Special law to redeem pro-Japanese collaborators' property
 List of prime ministers of Korea
 Lee Wan-yong

References

External links 
 Pak Chesoon 
 Pak Chesoon 

1858 births
1919 deaths
People from Yongin
Kazoku
Korean collaborators with Imperial Japan
Prime Ministers of Korea
Joseon politicians
19th-century Korean people

Imperial Korean military personnel
Lieutenant generals of Korean Empire
Politicians of the Korean Empire